Sergey Detkov (born 5 March 1979) is a Russian orienteering competitor.

He received a silver medal at the World Games in 2005 in the mixed relay, with Aliya Sitdikova, Maxim Davydov and Tatiana Ryabkina.

He received a silver medal in the short distance and finished 4th in the classic distance at the 1999 Junior World Orienteering Championships in Varna.

References

External links
 
 Sergey Detkov at World of O Runners

1979 births
Living people
Russian orienteers
Male orienteers
Foot orienteers
World Games silver medalists
Competitors at the 2005 World Games
World Games medalists in orienteering
21st-century Russian people
Junior World Orienteering Championships medalists